Rhinos Rugby Oudenaarde is a Belgian rugby club in Oudenaarde.

History
The club was founded in 2002 by former club chairman Thomas Bergé. In 2016 the general assembly appointed Bruno Cruyt and Emilie Nachtergaele as new chairmen. Currently, Rhinos Rugby Oudenaarde counts over 200 members. On 10 December 2016 the general assembly gave their approval to the board to invest in a new clubhouse and two sport fields next to the Liefmans Brewery in the center of Oudenaarde.

Season by Season

References

External links
 Rhinos Rugby Oudenaarde

Belgian rugby union clubs
Rugby clubs established in 1999
Oudenaarde
1999 establishments in Belgium